Schönengrund is a municipality in the canton of Appenzell Ausserrhoden in Switzerland.

Geography

Of this area, 65.5% is used for agricultural purposes, while 30.1% is forested. The rest of the land, (4.4%) is settled.

Demographics
Schönengrund has a population of 488, of which about 3.4% are foreign nationals.  Over the last 10 years the population has decreased at a rate of -0.6%.  Most of the population speaks German  (97.8%), with Serbo-Croatian being second most common ( 0.9%) and Spanish being third ( 0.4%).

, the gender distribution of the population was 50.8% male and 49.2% female.  The age distribution, in Schönengrund is; 45 people or 9.8% of the population are between 0–6 years old.  73 people or 15.9% are 6-15, and 23 people or 5.0% are 16-19.  Of the adult population, 21 people or 4.6% of the population are between 20–24 years old.  130 people or 28.3% are 25-44, and 108 people or 23.5% are 45-64.  The senior population distribution is 46 people or 10.0% of the population are between 65–79 years old, and  13 people or 2.8% are over 80.

In the 2007 federal election the FDP received 77.9% of the vote.

In Schönengrund about 70.1% of the population (between age 25-64) have completed either non-mandatory upper secondary education or additional higher education (either university or a Fachhochschule).

Schönengrund has an unemployment rate of 1.35%.  , there were 57 people employed in the primary economic sector and about 28 businesses involved in this sector.  20 people are employed in the secondary sector and there are 7 businesses in this sector.  49 people are employed in the tertiary sector, with 17 businesses in this sector.

The historical population is given in the following table:

Tourism
Schönengrund attracts tourists both during the winter and summer. During winter downhill skiing, snowboarding and cross-country skiing are offered. During the summer, hiking attracts tourists.

References

External links
 Official Page

Municipalities of Appenzell Ausserrhoden